Classical Tibetan refers to the language of any text written in Tibetic after the Old Tibetan period. Though it extends from the 12th century until the modern day, it particularly refers to the language of early canonical texts translated from other languages, especially Sanskrit. The phonology implied by Classical Tibetan orthography is very similar to the phonology of Old Tibetan, but the grammar varies greatly depending on period and geographic origin of the author. Such variation is an under-researched topic.

In 816, during the reign of King Sadnalegs, literary Tibetan underwent a thorough reform aimed at standardizing the language and vocabulary of the translations being made from Sanskrit, which was one of the main influences for literary standards in what is now called Classical Tibetan.

Nouns

Structure of the noun phrase
Nominalizing suffixes — pa or ba and ma — are required by the noun or adjective that is to be singled out;
 po or bo (masculine) and mo (feminine) are used for distinction of gender.

The plural is denoted, when required, by adding the morpheme ; when the collective nature of the plurality is stressed the morpheme -dag is instead used. These two morphemes combine readily (e.g.  'a group with several members', and  'several groups').

Cases
The classical written language has ten cases.

 absolutive (unmarked morphologically)
 genitive (གི་ -gi,  གྱི་ -gyi, ཀྱི་ -kyi, འི་ -i, ཡི་ -yi)
 agentive (གིས་ -gis, གྱིས་ -, ཀྱིས་ -, ས་ -s, ཡིས་ -)
 locative (ན་ -na)
 allative (ལ་ -la)
 terminative (རུ་ -ru, སུ་ -su, ཏུ་ -tu, དུ་ -du, ར་ -r)
 comitative (དང་ -dang)
 ablative (ནས་ -nas)
 elative (ལས་ -las)
 comparative (བས་ -bas)

Case markers are affixed to entire noun phrases, not to individual words (i.e. Gruppenflexion).

Traditional Tibetan grammarians do not distinguish case markers in this manner, but rather distribute these case morphemes (excluding -dang and -bas) into the eight cases of Sanskrit.

Pronouns
There are personal, demonstrative, interrogative and reflexive pronouns, as well as an indefinite article, which is plainly related to the numeral for "one."

Personal pronouns
As an example of the pronominal system of classical Tibetan, the Milarepa rnam thar exhibits the following personal pronouns.

Like in French, the plural (ཁྱེད་ ) can be used a polite singular.

Verbs
Verbs do not inflect for person or number. Morphologically there are up to four separate stem forms, which the Tibetan grammarians, influenced by Sanskrit grammatical terminology, call the "present" (lta-da), "past" ('''das-pa), "future" (ma-'ongs-pa), and "imperative" (skul-tshigs), although the precise semantics of these stems is still controversial. The so-called future stem is not a true future, but conveys the sense of necessity or obligation.

The majority of Tibetan verbs fall into one of two categories, those that express implicitly or explicitly the involvement of an agent, marked in a sentence by the instrumental particle (kyis etc) and those that express an action that does not involve an agent.  Tibetan grammarians refer to these categories as tha-dad-pa and tha-mi-dad-pa respectively. Although these two categories often seem to overlap with the English grammatical concepts of transitive and intransitive, most modern writers on Tibetan grammar have adopted the terms "voluntary" and "involuntary", based on native Tibetan descriptions. Most involuntary verbs lack an imperative stem.

Inflection
Many verbs exhibit stem ablaut among the four stem forms, thus a or e in the present tends to become o in the imperative byed, byas, bya, byos ('to do'), an e in the present changes to a in the past and future (len, longs 'to take'); in some verbs a present in i changes to u in the other stems (dzin,  'to take').  Additionally, the stems of verbs are also distinguished by the addition of various prefixes and suffixes, thus  (present),  (past),  (future), ' (imperative).  Though the final -s suffix, when used, is quite regular for the past and imperative, the specific prefixes to be used with any given verb are less predictable; while there is a clear pattern of b- for a past stem and g- for a future stem, this usage is not consistent.

Only a limited number of verbs are capable of four changes; some cannot assume more than three, some two, and many only one. This relative deficiency is made up by the addition of auxiliaries or suffixes both in the classical language and in the modern dialects.

Negation
Verbs are negated by two prepositional particles: mi and ma.  Mi is used with present and future stems. The particle ma is used with the past stem; prohibitions do not employ the imperative stem, rather the present stem is negated with ma. There is also a negative stative verb med 'there is not, there does not exist', the counterpart to the stative verb yod 'there is, there exists'

Honorifics
As with nouns, Tibetan also has a complex system of honorific and polite verbal forms.  Thus, many verbs for everyday actions have a completely different form to express the superior status, whether actual or out of courtesy, of the agent of the action, thus lta 'see', hon. gzigs; byed 'do', hon. mdzad. Where a specific honorific verb stem does not exist, the same effect is brought about by compounding a standard verbal stem with an appropriate general honorific stem such as mdzad.

See also

 Standard Tibetan

References

Further reading
 

Beyer, Stephen, 1992. The Classical Tibetan language. New York: State University of New York. Reprint 1993, (Bibliotheca Indo-Buddhica series, 116.) Delhi: Sri Satguru.
Hahn, Michael, 2003. Schlüssel zum Lehrbuch der klassischen tibetischen Schriftsprache Marburg : Indica et Tibetica Verlag

 

Hodge, Stephen, 2003. An introduction to classical Tibetan. Bangkok: Orchid Press
Schwieger, Peter, 2006. Handbuch zur Grammatik der klassischen tibetischen Schriftsprache. Halle: International Institute for Tibetan and Buddhist Studies GmbH.
Tournadre, Nicolas (2003). Manual of Standard Tibetan (MST). Ithaca, NY: Snow Lion Publications, p. 479.
skal-bzhang 'gur-med, 1992. Le clair miroir : enseignement de la grammaire Tibetaine (trans.) Heather Stoddard & Nicholas Tournandre, Paris : Editions Prajna

External links

Tibetan in Digital Communication
Translations of Tibetan texts, Tibetan language courses & publications by Erick Tsiknopoulos and the Trikāya Translation Committee.

Bodic languages
Languages of Tibet
Languages of Nepal
Languages written in Tibetan script
Tibetan, Classical
Tibetan, Classical
Sacred languages